William Chirchir (born 6 February 1979, in Bomet) is a Kenyan runner (Kipsigis tribe) who specializes in the 1500 metres. He is a former holder of the world junior record over the distance with 3:33.24 minutes from 1998.

Achievements

Personal bests
800 metres - 1:43.33 min (1999)
1500 metres - 3:29.29 min (2001)
One mile - 3:47.94 min (2000)
3000 metres - 7:55.78 min (1998)

External links

Pace Sports Management

1979 births
Living people
Kenyan male middle-distance runners
Olympic male middle-distance runners
Athletes (track and field) at the 2000 Summer Olympics
Athletes (track and field) at the 2002 Commonwealth Games
Olympic athletes of Kenya
Commonwealth Games silver medallists for Kenya
Commonwealth Games medallists in athletics
Medallists at the 2002 Commonwealth Games